The  ("skyway of peace") is a pedestrian and bicycle bridge over the Rhône river in Lyon, France. It connects the 6th arrondissement of Lyon and the commune of Caluire-et-Cuire.

Grand Lyon commissioned the construction of a bridge between Cité Internationale and Place Basse Demonchy in Parc Saint-Clair in Caluire-et-Cuire. The project was first conceived in 1994, but construction was held up by a legal dispute over who would be the primary contractor. The project was revived in 2009 with Austrian architect Dietmar Feichtinger creating the design for the bridge. The construction of the bridge began in March 2012. The bridge was named "Passerelle de la Paix" on 22 October 2012 to represent intercultural harmony, because the neighbourhood of Saint-Clair has a large immigrant population. Construction concluded on 13 December 2013 and opened to the public on 17 March 2014.

See also

 Bridges of Lyon

References

External links

Bridges completed in 2014
Bridges over the Rhône
Buildings and structures in Lyon
Pedestrian bridges in France
6th arrondissement of Lyon
2014 establishments in France
Cyclist bridges
21st-century architecture in France